Michael Briggs may refer to:

Michael Briggs (police officer) (1971–2006), police officer from Manchester, New Hampshire, shot in 2006
Michael Fenwick Briggs (1926–2017), British businessman
Michael Briggs, Lord Briggs of Westbourne (born 1954), judge of the Court of Appeal of England and Wales
Michael Briggs (racing driver) (born 1966), South African racing driver
Mike Briggs (politician) (born 1959), American politician
Mike Briggs (tennis) (born 1968), American tennis player
Michael Peter Briggs (scientist) (born 1944), British scientist and university administrator